Northern Vermont University (NVU) is a public university in Johnson and Lyndon, Vermont.  Established in 2018 by the unification of the former Johnson State College and Lyndon State College, the university offers over 50 Bachelor's degree programs and Master's degree programs. On July 1, 2023, it will become a campus of Vermont State University.

History 
In September 2016, the Vermont State Colleges board of trustees voted to unify Lyndon State College with Johnson State College, located roughly 50 miles apart. The new combined institution was named Northern Vermont University, and JSC President Elaine Collins was named as NVU's first president to oversee the consolidation of both campus into the new university. The merger became effective on July 1, 2018 and ended over 100 years of the two colleges' existence as separate institutions, although the combined university remains public and under the Vermont State College system.

For many years, the Vermont public colleges have experienced financial stress and chronic underfunding.  Exacerbated by COVID-19, in April 2020, Vermont State Colleges system Chancellor Jeb Spaulding recommended closing Northern Vermont University as well as Vermont Technical College.  Under the proposal, some of the NVU academic programs would move to another public state college, Castleton University.  Faculty, staff, and others have protested the proposal.

Due to ongoing financial challenges and low enrollment in the Vermont State Colleges, Northern Vermont University will be merging with Castleton University and Vermont Technical College. Vermont State University will begin on July 1, 2023.

Facilities

Johnson campus

The Dibden Center for the Arts 
Named for Arthur J. Dibden, president of Johnson State College 1967-69, Dibden oversaw the expansion and development of the fine and performing arts programs. The center is located on the southwest side of the campus and houses the college's Dance, Music, and Theater programs as well as gallery exhibition space for the Fine Arts programs. The striking late modernist building, whose sculptural roofline echoes the contours of the Sterling Mountain Range–its backdrop to the south, is the work of architect Robert Burley. Burley apprenticed in the studio of Eero Saarinen. The large 500-seat Dibden Theater with a 44' proscenium stage is the centerpiece of the performing arts facilities at the center. Excellent acoustics are achieved by a system of hardwood baffles along the walls and ceilings. Practice and instruction rooms wrap around the theater and the Julian Scott Memorial Gallery on the front of the center showcases exhibitions of fine art and design by the college's fine art students as well as travelling exhibitions and the work of visiting artists. The Dibden Center for the Arts houses the faculties of the Department of Music and the Department of Theater, a recording studio, music studios, practice rooms, classrooms and a piano laboratory. Recitals and concerts, theater and contemporary dance performances, and open rehearsals bring performing arts into the daily life of the college. The Vermont Symphony Orchestra performs regularly at the center. Several performing arts series available to the college community, are also available to the public by subscription. The Dibden Center is an important fine and performing arts venue for all of Vermont. One of the best aspects of Dibden is the fact that it is fully student run, both working Front of House and backstage, so there is always learning and working opportunity for students that seek work opportunities and those who would like to learn more about the theater.
The new Library and Learning Center in the main quadrangle's northwest corner. The LLC building, is home to the Department of Humanities and the Department of Writing and Literature.

Library and Learning Center 
Johnson's Library and Learning Center (LLC) opened in 1996 and incorporates the collections of the older John Dewey Library with expanded collections and new technology. The print collection includes 130,000+ volumes and over 700 journals and periodicals. The LLC houses the largest collections of fine arts publications in Vermont and is a designated National Archives and Records Administration repository. The contemporary, green design building makes use of passive and active solar heating. Its south-southwest orientation for reading rooms utilizes natural light. The LLC is built of terra cotta brick, Vermont gray granite, Vermont blue-gray slate, steel, and green-tinted glass. The LLC was designed by the architectural firm of Gossens Bachman Architects and has won numerous awards for its architecture and environmental efficiency. Awards include the 1997 American Institute of Architects (AIA) Vermont "Excellence in Architecture Award." The LLC also houses the faculties of the Department of Humanities, and the Department of Writing and Literature. A skybridge links the LLC with Wilson Bentley Hall. The LLC has become a community centerpiece and serves as a gateway to the northwest side of the quadrangle. An informal outdoor amphitheater facing the quadrangle has become a popular outdoor social area in warmer weather.

John Dewey Hall 
John Dewey Hall on the south side of the quadrangle was built in 1963 in the International Style to house the college's library. It is named for the philosopher and educator John Dewey. The building is lit by natural light from a panoramic glass clerestory around the perimeter of the building. Today the building houses the college bookstore, the office of the dean of students, the Student Association, the Registration and Advising Center, TRIO, academic advising, and career & internship offices.

Visual Arts Center 
Johnson's Visual Arts Center (VAC) houses the college's Visual Arts Programs, which was renovated in 2012, with studios for design, drawing, painting, printmaking, photography, sculpture, ceramics and woodworking. The Digital Imaging Laboratory (DIL) is also located here with state-of-the-art oversized high-resolution laser CMYK and Inkjet printers. The VAC augments exhibition space at the Julian Scott Memorial Gallery in the Dibden Center with a gallery for exhibiting works in progress and student projects. Exhibitions play a major role in both academic and student life at Johnson. Students have opportunities to show their work beginning in their freshman year. Exhibition programs support and expand the studio curriculum, providing students with frequent opportunities to share their work and receive input; and, by exhibiting faculty and visiting artists' work, providing insights into teachers’ approaches to making art and critique. Exhibitions in many mediums both of work produced within the college, and by work exhibited by visiting artists exposes students to a wide range of contemporary thinking and art-making methods. Fine arts majors in the freshman and sophomore levels most commonly exhibit work in the VAC. Students in their junior and senior years, especially those presenting thesis level work exhibit in the Julian Scott Memorial Gallery at the Dibden Center for the Arts.

Wilson Bentley Science Hall 
Named for the scientist-artist, Wilson Bentley (1865–1931) who first photographed snowflakes in the nineteenth century in nearby Jericho, Vermont. Bentley brought an objective scientific eye to the examination of snow and ice crystals via hugely magnified images called photomicrographs. Bentley published a monograph titled Snow Crystals which documented more than 2000 snowflakes and ice crystals. Wilson Bentley Hall, designed by noted architect Robert Burley, houses the faculties of the Department of Mathematics, and the Department of Environmental and Health Sciences. A 200-seat lecture hall with digital projection facilities, an interactive television studio, and laboratories for biology, chemistry, physical sciences, cartography, and geographic information systems. Bentley Hall also houses a state-of-the-art interactive multimedia computer laboratory and is a designated National Science Foundation research facility. The building also houses a meteorological station, and green house.

The Babcock Nature Preserve 
The Babcock Nature Preserve, located ten miles from Johnson in Eden, Vermont is a 1,000 acre (4 km²) tract of forest land owned and maintained by the college for scientific and educational study. A large, environmentally significant bog, and three large ponds dominate the physical landscape. The Babcock Nature Preserve is a natural laboratory for field biology, ornithology and environmental sciences courses. The summer field program at the Babcock Nature Preserve features a number of intensive courses designed to provide field experience in the environmental and natural sciences.

Lyndon campus

Theodore N. Vail Center 

The Vail Center has classrooms and teachers' offices, especially English, mathematics, and education. It also contains the Vail Museum, mail room and The Hornet's Nest, the campus snack bar. The science wing contains classrooms and laboratories. There is a television wing for the television studies and is home to News 7, Lyndon's daily live broadcast facility. It also contains the small Alexander Twilight Theater.

Samuel Read Hall Library & Academic Center 

The Samuel Read Hall Library & Academic Center (LAC) contains classrooms, a 24-hour computer lab, and the three-floor Samuel Read Hall Library. There is a large pond adjacent to the library.

Harvey Academic Center 

The Harvey Academic Center (HAC) is located at the center of campus, and houses offices and classrooms for arts and outdoors classes. The Center also hosts the Quimby Gallery, a small regional art gallery named after alumnus Susan Quimby.

Academic and Student Activity Center 

The Academic and Student Activity Center (ASAC) is on the western side of campus, and houses science and business classrooms, along with the Moore Community Room and the university's weather station.

Veteran's Park 
Veteran's Park is a small grassy common area in the center of campus dedicated to alumni and current students who served or are serving in the armed forces. Multiple walkways surround the park.

SHAPE Center 
The SHAPE Center is Lyndon's fitness center, containing multiple fitness-related rooms. The George W. Stannard Gymnasium is the primary gymnasium for sporting events, with a seating capacity of 1,500. The smaller Rita L. Bole Gymnasium is primarily used for intramural athletics and exercise science classes, as it has no permanent seating. The SHAPE Center also contains a swimming pool, fitness center, racquetball court, and rock climbing wall.

Brown House 
On the north side of the campus across from the baseball fields is the Brown House, the university's health and counseling center. The Brown House also houses Lyndon Rescue, Inc., a regional ambulance service that evolved from the Lyndon State Rescue Squad, a former club formed in 1972.

Gray House 
The Gray House is a special residential opportunity, currently for those performing service to the community.

Residence halls 

Half of the student population lives on campus in one of the nine residence halls. The Stonehenge residence hall complex is located on the southern end of campus, and consists of six residence halls: Whitelaw/Crevecoeur (first-year students), Arnold/Bayley, and Poland/Rogers. They are clustered around a central courtyard and shaped in a circle, hence the nickname "Stonehenge." Wheelock is a residence hall that is located in the center of campus. Rita Bole is the newest of the residence halls, which features apartment-style living for upperclassmen.The ninth hall, Gray House, is a living-learning community dedicated to performing community service on campus and in the local area.

Athletics

Johnson Badgers 
Johnson State College teams participate as a member of the National Collegiate Athletic Association's Division III. The Badgers are a member of the North Atlantic Conference (NAC).

Men's sports include 
 Basketball
 Cross country 
 Golf 
 Soccer 
 Tennis 
 Track & field 
 Volleyball

Women's sports include 
 Basketball
 Cross country
 Soccer
Softball
 Tennis
Triathlon
 Track & field
 Volleyball

In 2018, women's triathlon was added to the varsity sports roster, representing the only NCAA institution in New England to carry women's triathlon as a varsity sport.

Lyndon Hornets 
The Lyndon State Hornets are a member of the NCAA, and compete on the Division III level in the North Atlantic Conference.

LSC has 12 NCAA sponsored teams, which include:

Men's Sports
 Baseball
 Men's basketball
 Men's cross country
 Men's lacrosse
 Men's soccer
 Softball
 Men's tennis

Women's Sports
 Women's basketball
 Women's cross country
 Women's soccer
 Women's tennis
 Women's volleyball

LSC has five club teams:

 Men's ice hockey
 Men's rugby
 Women's rugby
 Ultimate Frisbee
 Dance team

Notable alumni

Lyndon State College 
 André Bernier, 1981 (Lyndon State College), Meteorologist WJW-TV, Cleveland, Ohio
 Jim Cantore, 1986 (Lyndon State College), Meteorologist-announcer on The Weather Channel
 Nick Gregory, 1982 (Lyndon State College), Meteorologist WNYW-TV, New York City
 Mark Valade, (Lyndon State College), CEO Carhartt

Johnson State College 
 Susan Bartlett, former member of the Vermont Senate from the Lamoille district
 Jim DeRose, head coach of the Bradley Braves men’s soccer team
 Cyndi Lauper, singer, songwriter, actress and LGBT rights activist
 Raymond J. McNulty, Dean of the School of Education at Southern New Hampshire University
 Walter Mosley, crime fiction novelist
 Anthony Pollina, member of the Vermont Senate from the Washington district
 Julian Scott, Union Army drummer during the American Civil War, recipient of the Medal of Honor

References

External links 
 

Public universities and colleges in Vermont
Educational institutions established in 2018
Vermont State Colleges
Buildings and structures in Lyndon, Vermont
Education in Caledonia County, Vermont
Buildings and structures in Johnson, Vermont
Education in Lamoille County, Vermont
2018 establishments in Vermont